The Bonny Lass of Anglesey is Child ballad 220.

Synopsis

Fifteen English lords come to the king "To dance and win the victory." He gets the bonny lass to dance with them, offering her lands and either the fairest knight (of her choice), or the bravest, in his court.  She wins.  The fifteenth lord laid aside his sword but still had to admit defeat—in one variant, for exhaustion.

Commentary
The significance of this dancing competition and the "victory" won is unclear.  The point is that none of the knights can outdance her.

Francis James Child classified it among the "historical" ballads.

Adaptions
Delia Sherman reworked this ballad in her short story "The Fiddler of Bayou Teche".

References

Child Ballads
Year of song unknown
Songwriter unknown